A necromancer is a person who practices necromancy, a discipline of black magic used to communicate with the dead to foretell the future.

Necromancer or The Necromancer may also refer to:

Fictional character
 Sauron, a character in J. R. R. Tolkien's legendarium, referred to as "the Necromancer" in The Hobbit
 Necromancer (Dungeons & Dragons), a character class in the fantasy role-playing game Dungeons & Dragons
 Necromancer, a recurring character class in the action role-playing game franchise Diablo
 The Necromancer, a character in the television series Charmed
 A class of flying android in the atheist/Mithraic wars in Ridley Scott's Raised by Wolves

Film
 Necromancer (1988 film), a 1988 American horror film
 Necromancer (2005 film), a 2005 Thai horror film
 Nekromancer (film), a 2018 Australian science fiction horror film

Gaming
 Jaseiken Necromancer, a fantasy role-playing video game for the TurboGrafx-16, PlayStation Network and the Virtual Console
 Necromancer (board game), a board game published by Steve Jackson Games
 Necromancer (video game), an action video game for the Atari 8-bit family and the Commodore 64
 Necromancer Games, an American role-playing game publisher

Literature
 Necromancer (novel), a novel by Gordon R. Dickson
 Necromancer, a novel by Robert Holdstock
 The Necromancer (comics), a comic book published by the Top Cow
 The Necromancer (novella), a novella by Douglas Clegg
 The Necromancer: The Secrets of the Immortal Nicholas Flamel, the fourth book in a fantasy series by Michael Scott
 The Necromancer; or, The Tale of the Black Forest, a Gothic novel by Ludwig Flammenberg

Music
 "Necromancer" (Gnarls Barkley song)
 "Necromancer" (Judas Priest song)
 "Necromancer" (Sepultura song)
 "Necromancer" (Van der Graaf Generator song)
 "The Necromancer" (Rush song)